This is an article about Arnold Roth, the cartoonist. See also Arnie Roth, the musician.

Arnold Roth (born February 25, 1929) is an American cartoonist and illustrator for advertisements, album covers, books, magazines, and newspapers. Novelist John Updike wrote, "All cartoonists are geniuses, but Arnold Roth is especially so."

Career
Roth's art is in the collections of the Philadelphia Museum of Art, the Cartoon Art Museum (San Francisco), Philadelphia's Rosenbach Museum & Library and the Cartoonmuseum Basel (Basel, Switzerland), plus many private collections.

Magazines
Roth has done covers for The New Yorker and his artwork has appeared in TV Guide, Sports Illustrated and Esquire. His cartoons and illustrations were contributions to the satirical magazines edited by his friend Harvey Kurtzman: Trump (1957), Humbug (1957–58) and Help! (1960–65). Roth's cartoons began appearing in Playboy in the late 1950s. Playboy published ten multi-page installments of his An Illustrated History of Sex series in the late 1970s. Roth was a regular contributor of cartoon features to Punch from the late 1960s until the end of the 1980s. Roth had multi-page features in almost every one of the first 25 issues of National Lampoon (1970–72) until his last satirized the editors of the magazine. He was a political cartoonist for The Progressive from 1981 to 1987.

Comic strips
Roth drew the comic strip Poor Arnold's Almanac as a Sunday strip from 1959 to 1961. He brought it back as a daily panel in 1989-90. Fantagraphics Books published a collection of this strip in 1998.

Awards
He received the National Cartoonists Society Advertising and Illustration Award (1982, 1984, 1985); Illustration Award (1976, 1979, 1981); Magazine and Book Illustration Award (1986, 1987, 1988); Special Feature Award (1979); Sports Cartoon Award (1976, 1977); Reuben Award (1983); and their Gold Key Award (their Hall of Fame) in 2000. He served as the organization's president from 1983 to 1985.

On June 25, 2009, Roth was inducted into the Society of Illustrators Hall of Fame which honors artists for their “distinguished achievement in the art of illustration.” Past Society presidents select inductees based on their body of work and the impact on the field of illustration. Roth was previously recognized by the Society of Illustrators with numerous Silver and Gold Stars.

Books written and illustrated by Arnold Roth
Pick A Peck Of Puzzles - W.W. Norton & Company, 1966.
Arnold Roth's Crazy Book of Science. New York: Grosset & Dunlap, 1971.
A Comick Book of Sports - Scribners, 1974.
A Comick Book Of Pets - New York: Charles Scribner's Sons, 1976
No Pain, No Strain - New York: Saint Martin's Press, 1996
Poor Arnold's Almanac - Fantagraphics Books, 1998.

Books illustrated by Arnold Roth
“Wally The Wordworm” by Clifton Fadiman. Macmillan, New York, 1964.
“The Hater's Handbook: A Guide to the Wonderful World of Ill Will: The Catcalls, Abuse and Caustic Comment Flung at Persons of Note Throughout the Ages” by Joseph Rosner. Delacorte Press, NY, 1965
“Go on Wheels” by Julius Schwartz. NY McGraw-Hill Book Company, 1966
“Kids' Letters to the F.B.I. ” by Bill Adler. Prentice Hall, 1966
“Grimms' Fairy Tales: The Macmillan Classics”, afterword by Clifton Fadiman. Macmillan Co., NY, 1966
“Isabel's Noel” by Jane Yolen. NY: Funk & Wagnalls, 1967
“In the President's and My Opinion...” by Donald Pearce. Prentice-Hall, 1967.
“The President's Mystery Plot” by Franklin D. Roosevelt; Rupert Hughes; Samuel Hopkins Adams; Abbot, Anthony; Weiman, Rita; S. S. Van Dine; John Erskine; Erle Stanley Gardner. Prentice Hall, New York, 1967.
“What Every Good Boy Knew About Sex” by Sam Blum. Bernard Geis Associates, NY, 1967.

“How Many Miles to Galena? Or Baked, Hashed Brown or French Fried? ” by Richard Bissell. Little Brown, Boston, 1968.
“The Horse that Played Centerfield” by Hal Higdon. Holt Rinehart Winston, 1969.
“Stark Naked: A Paranomastic Odyssey” by Norton Juster. Random House, 1969.
“Bech: A Book” by John Updike. (cover art) HarperCollins, NY, 1970.
“The Inchworm and the Butterfly Peace” by Brock Brower. Doubleday & Co., NY, 1970.
“Little Spiro: His Letters, Poems, Essays, Songs and Drawings” by Ralph Schoenstein. William Morrow, New York, 1971.
“I Hear America Mating: A Hilarious Trek Through the Wilds of Modern Sex. ” by Ralph Schoenstein. St. Martin's Press, NY, 1972.
“The Witch Who Wasn't” by Jane Yolen. Collier Books, New York, 1974.
“East Vs. West” by Ralph Schoenstein. Simon & Schuster, 1981.
“Bech is Back” by John Updike. (cover art) Alfred A. Knopf, NY, 1982.
“A Sports Bestiary” by George Plimpton. McGraw-Hill, NY, 1982.
“The Further Adventures of Slugger Mcbatt” by W.P. Kinsella. Collins, Toronto, 1988.
“A Sound Heard Early on the Morning of Christ's Nativity” by John Updike. Northridge: Lord John Press, 2002,
“Flying to Florida” by John Updike - Northridge: Lord John Press, 2003
“Diggin Your Own Grave: Over 350 Foolproof Ways to Totally Screw Up Your Life” by B. L. Andrews. St. Martin's Press, 1994.
“Bech at Bay” by John Updike. (cover art) Alfred A. Knopf, NY, 1998.
“The Lexicon: A Cornucopia of Wonderful Words for the Inquisitive Word Lover” by William F. Buckley Jr. Harvest/HBJ Book, 1998.

Album covers
Roth created cover art for jazz and folk albums:
Dave Brubeck Octet (1950)
Dave Brubeck- Old Sounds from San Francisco (1955)Dave Brubeck's Jazz at the College of the Pacific (1953)Dave Brubeck's Jazz at the College of the Pacific Vol.2 (1953)Phil Napoleon and His Memphis Five (1955)Cal Tjader's Latin Kick (1956)The Art of Van Damme (1956)
"Dave Brubeck Trio" (1956)Jay & Kai + 6: Jay & Kai Trombone Octet (1956)Dave Brubeck Plays and Plays and Plays (1957)Boyd Raeburn: Fraternity Rush (1957)Dave Brubeck Quartet- Jazz Impressions of the USA (1957)Dave Brubeck Quartet in Europe (1958)Dave Brubeck Quintet-Reunion (1958)The Famous Castle Jazz Band In Stereo (1958)Breaking it Up! Louis Prima with Keely Smith (1958)Pete Seeger Sings Little Boxes and Other Broadsides (1963)

References

Further reading Arnold Roth: Free Lance, A Fifty Year Retrospective, published by Fantagraphics Books, 2001.The Comics Journal'' (June 1991) "Take Five," a 22-page interview with Arnold Groth

External links

Reuben Award bio
Roth at the Society of Illustrators in Manhattan Retrieved March 2013

1929 births
American comic strip cartoonists
American comics artists
Album-cover and concert-poster artists
Central High School (Philadelphia) alumni
Living people
Artists from Philadelphia
People from Princeton, New Jersey
Reuben Award winners
National Lampoon people